Patrizio Donati (1588 – 31 August 1666) was a Roman Catholic prelate who served as Bishop of Minori (1639–1648).

Biography
Patrizio Donati was born in 1588. On 28 February 1639, he was appointed during the papacy of Pope Urban VIII as Bishop of Minori. On 13 March 1639, he was consecrated bishop by Giovanni Battista Maria Pallotta, Cardinal-Priest of San Silvestro in Capite, with Tommaso Carafa, Bishop Emeritus of Vulturara e Montecorvino, and Giovanni Battista Altieri, Bishop Emeritus of Camerino, serving as co-consecrators. He served as Bishop of Minori until his resignation in August 1648. He died on 31 August 1666.

Episcopal succession
While bishop, he was the principal co-consecrator of:

See also
Catholic Church in Italy

References

External links and additional sources
 (for Chronology of Bishops) 
 (for Chronology of Bishops) 

17th-century Italian Roman Catholic bishops
Bishops appointed by Pope Urban VIII
1588 births
1666 deaths